The 1998 NAIA Men's Division I Basketball Tournament was held in March at Mabee Center in Tulsa, Oklahoma, and the last time for now NAIA Tournament at Mabee Center. The 61st annual NAIA basketball tournament featured 32 teams playing in a single-elimination format.

Awards and honors
Leading scorers: 
Leading rebounder: 
Player of the Year: Daniel Santiago (St. Vincent).

1998 NAIA bracket

  * denotes overtime.

See also
 1998 NCAA Division I men's basketball tournament
 1998 NCAA Division II men's basketball tournament
 1998 NCAA Division III men's basketball tournament
 1998 NAIA Division II men's basketball tournament
 1998 NAIA Division I women's basketball tournament

References

Tournament
NAIA Men's Basketball Championship
NAIA Division I men's basketball tournament
NAIA Division I men's basketball tournament